Medal of Honor: Pacific Assault is a first-person shooter video game, the story of which takes place during the Pacific War. It is the 7th installment of the Medal of Honor series.

Medal of Honor: Pacific Assault introduced some new features to the franchise, such as recovering health by calling the corpsman, and the ability to order squad members to give covering fire, regroup, move up and fall back.

Medal of Honor: Pacific Assault Director's Edition features some additional content, such as a presentation that shows the history of American-Japanese war, behind the in-game missions (levels) and a built-in music player that allows the user to listen to the soundtrack.

Plot
The game begins with the player, in the role of Pvt. Thomas Conlin, a U.S. Marine in the Pacific Theater of World War II, aboard the USS West Virginia during the attack on Pearl Harbor, taking part in the defense.
As Conlin's Amtrac approaches the shore, it's hit by an artillery shell, throwing Conlin and the other passengers into the shallow ocean, forcing them to wade ashore. Conlin fight his way onto to the shore, only to get cut down by a bullet during a Japanese counterattack. As he bleeds out, the game flashes back to the start of Conlin's first day of basic training, where the player is introduced to the characters that will become his squad; the squad leader Frank Minoso; a big, smooth talking, New Jersey native; sniper William "Willie" Gaines, a country boy from North Carolina; and corpsman James Sullivan, a quiet sailor from a rich family in Oak Park, Illinois. After training, Conlin is assigned, without the rest of his training battalion, to serve aboard the USS Arizona. He arrives at Pearl Harbor early on the morning of December.
Conlin is reassigned to the 2nd Marine Raider Battalion, together with his old bootcamp training mate they take part in the Makin Island raid. During the raid, they are tasked with destroying a radio tower, destroying a supply dump, and rescuing a downed airman, before returning to their insertion point to fend off a Japanese counter-attack and defend their submarines from an aerial attack.

Following the Makin raid, the squad is assigned to the 1st Marine Raider Battalion and deployed in the Guadalcanal, where they are first tasked with the defence of Henderson Field and the outlying area against a Japanese attack, culminating in a push to re-take the airfield. They take part in the Battle of Edson's Ridge and patrols of the Lunga River. As part of the Guadalcanal Mission, Conlin becomes an impromptu pilot, as he is required to take control of the SBD Dauntless.

Afterwards, Conlin is promoted to sergeant and squad leader. During the invasion of Tarawa, Conlin secures the beachhead before neutralizing a major Japanese command center and destroying Japanese AA guns, which are used by the Japanese to prevent American landing craft from approaching Tarawa atoll. Conlin and his men then continue to clear Tarawa of the remaining enemy forces.

Development

Pacific Assault was developed by EA Los Angeles and published by EA Games for the PC. It is primarily a first-person shooter, with the exception of one level in which the player flies an SBD Dauntless in the middle of a dog fight. The engine of the game is a modified Lithtech Jupiter created from Monolith Productions in additional with Havok physics engine. The music was composed by Christopher Lennertz.

Reception

The game received "favorable" reviews according to video game review aggregator Metacritic.

Pacific Assault received a "Silver" sales award from the Entertainment and Leisure Software Publishers Association (ELSPA), indicating sales of at least 100,000 copies in the United Kingdom.

References

External links

2004 video games
Electronic Arts games
Pacific Assault
Multiplayer online games
Video games about the United States Marine Corps
Video games scored by Christopher Lennertz
Video games set in Hawaii
Video games set in Kiribati
Video games set in San Diego
Video games set in the Solomon Islands
Windows games
Windows-only games
World War II video games
Video games using Havok
Pacific War video games
Japan in non-Japanese culture
Multiplayer and single-player video games
Video games developed in the United States